Fred Langdon Bradley (July 31, 1920 – April 24, 2012) was a pitcher in Major League Baseball who played in  and  for the Chicago White Sox. Bradley was one of many baseball players whose career was interrupted during World War II.

Bradley was signed by the New York Yankees in 1940 and immediately was assigned to their minor league system. In 1941 and 1942, he averaged 15 wins per season before joining the U.S. Navy in 1943.

Following his military discharge, Bradley pitched in the Yankees' AAA system during 1946 and 1947. In 1948 he was dealt by New York, along Aaron Robinson and Bill Wight, to the White Sox in exchange for Eddie Lopat.

In 1948 Bradley posted a 4.60 earned run average in eight relief appearances for the White Sox and did not have a decision. He opened 1949 in the minor leagues and made one start with Chicago in May, after which he returned to the minors for two more seasons.

Bradley went 0–0 with a 5.60 ERA in nine games, allowing eleven earned runs on 15 hits and seven walks while striking out two in 17⅔ innings of work. In a six-year minor league career, he went 61–52 with a 3.63 ERA in 172 games.

Sources

External links
 Fred Bradley's obituary

1920 births
2012 deaths
Major League Baseball pitchers
Chicago White Sox players
Idaho Falls Russets players
Kansas City Blues (baseball) players
Memphis Chickasaws players
Tacoma Tigers players
Wenatchee Chiefs players
United States Navy personnel of World War II
Baseball players from Kansas
People from Parsons, Kansas
United States Navy sailors